Daniel Peña may refer to:

 Daniel Peña (engineer) (born 1948), Spanish engineer
 Daniel Peña (novelist) (born 1988), Mexican-American novelist, essayist, and critic
 Dan Peña (Daniel S. Peña Sr., born 1945), American businessman